Roses Are Red is a 1947 American film noir crime drama film directed by James Tinling, featuring film stars Don Castle and Peggy Knudsen.

The film features an early performance by Jeff Chandler as a gangster.

Cast 
Don Castle as Robert A. Thorne/Don Carney
Peggy Knudsen as Martha McCormack
Patricia Knight as Jill Carney
Joe Sawyer as Police Lt. Rocky Wall
Edward Keane as Jim Locke
Jeff Chandler as John Jones aka The Knuckle
Charles McGraw as Duke Arno
Charles Lane as Lipton
Paul Guilfoyle as George "Buster" Cooley
Douglas Fowley as Ace Oliver
James Arness as Ray (credited as James Aurness)

References

External links 

 
 
 
 
Review of film at Variety

1947 films
1947 crime drama films
20th Century Fox films
American crime drama films
American black-and-white films
Films produced by Sol M. Wurtzel
Films directed by James Tinling
1940s English-language films
1940s American films